The 1910 Swansea District by-election was a parliamentary by-election held for the House of Commons constituency of Swansea District in Glamorgan in South Wales on 28 February 1910.

Vacancy
The by-election was caused by the appointment of the sitting Liberal MP, Sir David Brynmor Jones, KC to be Recorder of Merthyr Tydfil. Under the Parliamentary rules of the day, if he wished to remain an MP, he was required to resign and fight a by-election.

Candidates
The Swansea District Liberals re-selected Jones. At the general election of January 1910 he had been returned with the substantial majority of 6,073 votes over his Unionist opponent.

The result
There being no other candidates putting themselves forward, Brynmor Jones was returned unopposed.

See also
Lists of United Kingdom by-elections 
United Kingdom by-election records

References

1910 elections in the United Kingdom
Unopposed ministerial by-elections to the Parliament of the United Kingdom in Welsh constituencies
Elections in Swansea
1910 in Wales
1910s elections in Wales
20th century in Swansea
February 1910 events